Bernat Vilaplana is a Spanish film editor. He is best known for his collaborations with J.A. Bayona and Guillermo del Toro, having worked with Bayona on The Impossible, A Monster Calls and Jurassic World: Fallen Kingdom and with del Toro on Pan's Labyrinth, Hellboy II: The Golden Army and Crimson Peak.

Filmography

References

Living people
Year of birth missing (living people)
Place of birth missing (living people)
Spanish film editors